Functional training is a classification of exercise which involves training the body for the activities performed in daily life.

Origins
Functional training has its origins in rehabilitation. Physical and occupational therapists and chiropractors often use this approach to retrain patients with movement disorders. Interventions are designed to incorporate task and context specific practice in areas meaningful to each patient, with an overall goal of functional independence. For example, exercises that mimic what patients did at home or work may be included in treatment in order to help them return to their lives or jobs after an injury or surgery.  Thus if a patient's job required repeatedly heavy lifting, rehabilitation would be targeted towards heavy lifting, if the patient were a parent of young children, it would be targeted towards moderate lifting and endurance, and if the patient were a marathon runner, training would be targeted towards re-building endurance. However, treatments are designed after careful consideration of the patient's condition, what he or she would like to achieve, and ensuring goals of treatment are realistic and achievable.

Functional training attempts to adapt or develop exercises which allow individuals to perform the activities of daily life more easily and without injuries.

In the context of body building, functional training involves mainly weight bearing activities targeted at core muscles of the abdomen and lower back. Fabio Martella wrote that most fitness facilities have a variety of weight training machines which target and isolate specific muscles.  As a result, the movements do not necessarily bear any relationship to the movements people make in their regular activities or sports.

In rehabilitation, training does not necessarily have to involve weight bearing activities, but can target any task or a combination of tasks that a patient is having difficulty with. Balance training, for example, is often incorporated into a patient's treatment plan if it has been impaired after injury or disease.

Evidence 
Rehabilitation after stroke has evolved over the past 15 years from conventional treatment techniques to task specific training techniques which involve training of basic functions, skills and endurance (muscular and cardiovascular). Functional training has been well supported in evidenced based research for rehabilitation of this population. It has been shown that task specific training yields long-lasting cortical reorganization which is specific to the areas of the brain being used with each task. Studies have also shown that patients make larger gains in functional tasks used in their rehabilitation and since they are more likely to continue practicing these tasks in everyday living, better results during follow-up are obtained.

Equipment 

Some options include:

 Clubbells
 Macebells
 Cable machines
 Barbells
 Dumbbells
 Medicine balls
 Kettlebells
 Bodyweight training
 Physioballs (also called Swiss balls or exercise balls)
 Resistance bands
 Rocker and wobble boards
 Whole Body Vibration equipment (also called WBV or Acceleration Training)
 Balance disks
 Sandbags
 Suspension system
 Slideboard
 Redcord
 Ropes

In rehabilitation however, equipment is mainly chosen by its relevance to the patient. In many cases equipment needs are minimal and include things that are familiar and useful to the patient.

Cable machines
Cable machines, also known as pulley machines, are large upright machines, either with a single pulley, or else a pulley attached to both sides.  They allow an athlete to recruit all major muscle groups while moving in multiple planes.  Cable machines also provide a smooth, continuous action which reduces the need for momentum to start repetitions, provide a constant tension on the muscle, peak-contraction is possible at the top of each rep, a safe means of performing negative repetitions, and a variety of attachments that allow great flexibility in the exercises performed and body parts targeted.

Components of a functional exercise program 
To be effective, a functional exercise program should include a number of different elements which can be adapted to an individual's needs or goals:
 Based on functional tasks directed toward everyday life activities. 
 Individualized – a training program should be tailored to each individual. Any program must be specific to the goals of an individual, focusing on meaningful tasks. It must also be specific to the individual state of health, including presence or history of injury. An assessment should be performed to help guide exercise selection and training load.
 Integrated – It should include a variety of exercises that work on flexibility, core, balance, strength and power, focusing on multiple movement planes.
 Progressive – Progressive training steadily increases the difficulty of the task.
 Periodized – mainly by training with distributed practice and varying the tasks.
 Repeated frequently.
 Use of real life object manipulation.
 Performed in context-specific environments.
 Feedback should be incorporated following performance (self-feedback of success is used as well as trainer/therapist feedback).

See also
Direct visual feedback

References

Physical exercise
Weight training
Aerobic exercise